Artyomovsky is a town in Sverdlovsk Oblast, Russia, located on the Bobrovka River (Irbit's tributary, Ob's basin),  northeast of Yekaterinburg. Population:

History
Founded in 1665, it was originally called Yegorshin povytok, after Yegorsha Kozhevin, a Cossack who owned the land. The village later became known as Yegorshina derevnya; in 1864 its name officially became Yegorshino. A coal deposit was discovered in the vicinity of the village in 1871. During Soviet times, a settlement Imeni Artyoma was established near the coal deposits. In 1938, Yegorshino and Imeni Artyoma were merged into the town of Artyomovsky.

The biggest main ventilation fan plant in CIS, Ventprom is hoisted in Artyomovsky.

References

External links
Official website of Artyomovsky 
Directory of organizations in Artyomovsky 

Cities and towns in Sverdlovsk Oblast
Populated places established in 1665
1665 establishments in Russia